Sidi is an Arabic honorific.

Sidi may also refer to:

People
 Sidi Heddi, 13th century Moroccan marabout and founder of the Heddāwa Islamic order
 Sidi al-Ayachi (died 1641), Moroccan marabout, warlord and jihadist
 Sidi Alioum (born 1982), Cameroonian football referee
 Sidi Larbi Cherkaoui (born 1976), Belgian-Moroccan dancer, choreographer and director
 Sidi Fofana (born 1992), French footballer
 Sidi Yaya Keita (born 1985), Malian former footballer
 Sidi Saleh (born 1979), Indonesian film director
 Sidi Moro Sanneh (born 1947), Gambian economist
 Nick Sidi (born 1966), English actor
 Péter Sidi (born 1978), Hungarian sport shooter and former world champion
 Irán Eory, stage name of Iranian-born Spaniard and Mexican actress and model Elvira Sidi (1937–2002)
 Sidi Tal, Jewish singer and actress in Yiddish born Sorele Birkental (1912–1983)

Other uses
 SIDI, an Italian cycling and motorcycling shoe manufacturer
 Sidi language, an extinct Bantu language of India
 Spark Ignition Direct Injection (SIDI), more commonly called Direct Injection Spark Ignition

See also 
 
 Sidis (disambiguation)
 Siddi (disambiguation)
 Siddi, a community of Sufis from the region of Gujarat, India, who arrived from East Africa in the 12th century

Surnames of Algerian origin